Jakub Kisiel (born 5 February 2003) is a Polish professional footballer who plays as a midfielder for Ekstraklasa side Legia Warsaw.

Club career 
Kisiel came through the ranks of Polonia Warsaw, before joining their local Legia rivals in February 2020. He then fell victim to abuse from Legia fans, including a hostile banner at the stadium even before he played his first game, as he was viewed as a "traitor" by some hooligans.

He still went on to become a professional player with Legia, making his team debut on 6 February 2021 in a 2–0 Ekstraklasa home win against Raków Częstochowa. On 4 February 2022, Kisiel joined I liga side Stomil Olsztyn on loan from Legia.

Honours

Club
Legia Warsaw
Ekstraklasa: 2020–21

References

External links

2003 births
Living people
Polish footballers
Poland youth international footballers
Association football midfielders
People from Wyszków
Legia Warsaw players
Legia Warsaw II players
OKS Stomil Olsztyn players
Ekstraklasa players
I liga players
III liga players